Robert Willis (born March 15, 1987 in Chicago) is an American windsurfer. He competed at the 2012 Olympics in the RS:X.

Results

References

External links
 
 
 

1987 births
Living people
American male sailors (sport)
Sailors at the 2012 Summer Olympics – RS:X
Olympic sailors of the United States
Sportspeople from Chicago
American windsurfers